Natasha Cloud (born February 22, 1992) is an American professional basketball player for the Washington Mystics of the Women's National Basketball Association (WNBA).

High school 
Natasha Cloud gained recognition while being named AAAA First Team All-State as a senior. During this season she averaged 12.3 points, 7.9 rebounds, 5.2 assists, and 4.0 steals per game. She led Cardinal O'Hara to the Pennsylvania Interscholastic Athletic Association Class AAAA state finals two years in a row, as a junior and then to the second round as a senior. Both her junior and senior year she earned First Team All-Delco honors. As a junior, earned a Pennsylvania AAAA Third Team All-State selection. Earned the Michael Menichini Award in 2009.

College

University of Maryland 
2010–2011: Following a very successful high school career, Natasha Cloud, received a scholarship to play at the University of Maryland as a Terp. Cloud saw action in 31 of 32 games of her freshman year, and of those started games four through nine.

Her freshman year she led the team in assists twice and in blocks three times while also being named a teams Scholar Athlete.

Her coach, Brenda Frese, stated that:

Natasha is a very athletic and unselfish player who will do whatever her team needs to help us win. She's a strong defensive player, who can play either guard spot and is a terrific passer. Natasha has a ton of personality, is a good student and fits right in with our team.

Saint Joseph's University 

2011–2012: Due to NCAA transfer rules, Cloud sat out the 2011–2012 season, after transferring from Maryland. She was honored as member of the SJU Director's Honor Roll this season.

2012–2013: Cloud earned Atlantic 10 Defensive Player of the Year, along with earning a spot on the A10 all defensive team. In preseason, Cloud was named A10 Preseason All-Conference Second Team and Preseason All-Defensive Team.  With an impressive All- Big 5 First Team, Cloud was also named Atlantic 10 All-Conference Second Team. Earned SJU's Best Defensive Player Award and was twice named A10 Player of the Week and one time Big 5 Player of the week.  Cloud was named to the Nancy Lieberman Award Watch List for the top point guard in the nation.  Cloud was named Co-Captain to the team.  Ranked second nationally in assists per game (7.6), also set the SJU single-season record for assists (243).  Averaged 11.5 points and (team best) 6.6 rebounds per game.  Led the A10 in assists and assists to turnover ratio.  Scored 13 points, 7 rebounds, 4 assists, two blocked shots and 2 steals in NCAA First Round win over Georgia.  She had 6 assists and added 10 points, a blocked shot and a steal in NCAA Second Round game against Connecticut, who ended up winning the National Championship.

2014–2015: Cloud averaged 12.9 points a game and led the Atlantic 10 in averaged minutes (37.6). Cloud was named Atlantic 10 All-Conference First Team and All- Defensive Team selection.  Cloud was a finalist for the Nancy Lieberman Award Watch List and Naismith Trophy Watch List nominee.  Named Big 5 Player of the Week three times. Cloud was named Hawk Classic All-Tournament Team member and Seton Hall Thanksgiving Invitational All-Tournament team honoree.  Cloud was also Preseason A10 All-Conference First Team and All-Defensive Team selection. With an impressive 187 assists, Cloud led the A10 in assists in a single season and finished her career with 163 rebounds and 50 steals.  Cloud also finished with 26 three-pointers, a career best.  Scored career-high 29 points, 5 rebounds, 3 assists, 2 steals and a blocked shot at Liberty.

Maryland and Saint Joseph's statistics
Source

Professional  career

WNBA 

Cloud was drafted in the 2015 WNBA draft, second round, 15th overall. Cloud was drafted to play for the Washington Mystics under Coach Mike Thibault. During Cloud's 2015 Rookie season, she averaged 3.6 points per game finishing the season with a total of 123. Just as a rookie, Cloud started in a handful of their season games and played a total of 657 minutes, averaging 19.3 minutes per game. Cloud averaged 2.8 rebounds, 3.4 assists per game.

Cloud scored 11 points in an 84–67 win against San Antonio Stars on June 29, 2016. However, the Mystics have been inconsistent in the 2016 season.

She suffered a left hip injury during practice at the Verizon Center.

On October 10, 2019, Cloud won her first WNBA championship.

In June 2020, Cloud announced that she would forgo the 2020 WNBA season due to concerns of racism and the coronavirus She wanted to be on the front lines and focus on social reform.

Beskitas CT 
Cloud played in Istanbul, Turkey for an organization called Besiktas CT Istanbul.  Cloud was involved with the organization for a few months (participating in a handful of games) before getting hurt and returning to the United States to get healthy for the 2016 WNBA season.

WNBA Statistics

Regular season

|-
| align="left" | 2015
| align="left" | Washington
| 34 || 22 || 19.3 || .320 || .237 || .681 || 2.8 || 3.4 || 0.9 || 0.1 || 1.4 || 3.6
|-
| align="left" | 2016
| align="left" | Washington
| 31 || 28 || 24.3 || .348 || .338 || .754 || 3.0 || 3.8 || 0.8 || 0.1 || 1.4 || 5.7
|-
| align="left" | 2017
| align="left" | Washington
| 24 || 0 || 18.7 || .314 || .235 || .741 || 2.5 || 2.9 || 0.7 || 0.1 || 1.0 || 4.4
|-
| align="left" | 2018
| align="left" | Washington
| 27 || 22 || 26.5 || .436 || .386 || .778 || 3.2 || 4.6 || 0.7 || 0.1 || 1.7 || 8.6
|-
| style="text-align:left;background:#afe6ba;" | 2019†
| align="left" | Washington
| 34 || 34 || 32.1 || .394 || .326 || .683 || 2.5 || 5.6 || 1.0 || 0.2 || 1.9 || 9.0
|-
| align="left" | 2021
| align="left" | Washington
| 27 || 27 || 31.6 || .389 || .274 || .836 || 3.6 || 6.4 || 1.4 || 0.1 || 2.2 || 8.7
|-
| align="left" | 2022
| align="left" | Washington
| 34 || 34 || 31.3 || .399 || .319 || .824 || 3.6 ||style="background:#D3D3D3"| 7.0 || 1.0 || 0.3 || 2.8 || 10.7
|-
| align="left" | Career
| align="left" | 7 years, 1 team
| 211 || 167 || 26.5 || .382 || .313 || .764 || 3.0 || 4.9 || 0.9 || 0.2 || 1.8 || 7.3
|}

Postseason

|-
| align="left" | 2015
| align="left" | Washington
| 3 || 2 || 14.0 || .429 || .333 || .000 || 1.0 || 1.3 || 1.0 || 0.0 || 1.7 || 2.3
|-
| align="left" | 2017
| align="left" | Washington
| 5 || 0 || 17.4 || .333 || .333 || .750 || 2.4 || 2.2 || 0.6 || 0.2 || 1.8 || 4.8
|-
| align="left" | 2018
| align="left" | Washington
| 9 || 9 || 25.7 || .400 || .414 || .769 || 3.4 || 4.1 || 0.8 || 0.1 || 1.9 || 8.2
|-
| style="text-align:left;background:#afe6ba;" | 2019†
| align="left" | Washington
| 9 || 9 || 34.2 || .442 || .378 || .850 || 3.4 || 6.2 || 1.1 || 0.2 || 1.3 || 13.1
|-
| align="left" | 2022
| align="left" | Washington
| 2 || 2 || 35.5 || .500 || .700 || 1.000 || 6.0 || 3.0 || 0.5 || 1.5 || 3.0 || 18.5
|-
| align="left" | Career
| align="left" | 5 years, 1 team
| 28 || 22 || 26.4 || .423 || .417 || .829 || 3.2 || 4.1 || 0.9 || 0.3 || 1.8 || 9.3
|}

Personal life
Cloud is married to professional softball player Aleshia Ocasio.

References

External links
Natasha Cloud - WNBA
St. Joseph's bio

1992 births
Living people
American expatriate basketball people in Turkey
American women's basketball players
Basketball players from Pennsylvania
Beşiktaş women's basketball players
Guards (basketball)
LGBT basketball players
LGBT people from Pennsylvania
Lesbian sportswomen
Maryland Terrapins women's basketball players
People from Marple Township, Pennsylvania
Saint Joseph's Hawks women's basketball players
Washington Mystics draft picks
Washington Mystics players